Art Metal is a progressive metal band based in Sweden and led by Jonas Hellborg. Some of their line-ups have included guitarist Mattias Eklundh of Freak Kitchen fame, the Johansson brothers, and Jonas Hellborg, an influential musician and solo artist in the jazz music scene. The band's music also has plenty of Indian music influence.

Mattias Eklundh and Jonas Hellborg made the cover of the Swedish Fuzz Magazine in support of Art Metal.

Discography
Art Metal (full-length, September 18, 2007)
Jazz Raj (full-length, 2014)

Line-up
Jonas Hellborg - bass
Mattias IA Eklundh - guitar
V. Selvaganesh - kanjira (1st Album except on Vyakhyan Kar)
Jens Johansson - keyboards (1st Album)
Ranjit Barot - drums on Jazz Raj
Anders Johansson - drums (1st Album)
Zoltan Csörsz Jr. - drums

References

Musical groups established in 2007
Swedish progressive metal musical groups
Jazz fusion ensembles